The 2019 Temple Owls football team represented Temple University during the 2019 NCAA Division I FBS football season. The Owls were led by first-year head coach Rod Carey and played their home games at Lincoln Financial Field, competing as a member of the East Division of the American Athletic Conference (AAC).

Previous season
The Owls finished the 2018 season 8–5, 7–1 in AAC play to finish in second place in the East Division. They were invited to the Independence Bowl where they were defeated by Duke. Following the season, Geoff Collins left the team to become the head coach at Georgia Tech. Collins was eventually replaced by Northern Illinois head coach Rod Carey.

Preseason

Award watch lists
Listed in the order that they were released

AAC media poll
The AAC media poll was released on July 16, 2019, with the Owls predicted to finish fourth in the AAC East Division.

Schedule

Game summaries

Bucknell

Maryland

at Buffalo

Georgia Tech

at East Carolina

Memphis

at SMU

UCF

at South Florida

Tulane

at Cincinnati

UConn

vs. North Carolina — Military Bowl

Rankings

Players drafted into the NFL

References

Temple
Temple Owls football seasons
Temple Owls football